"But You Know I Love You" is a song written by Mike Settle, which was a 1969 pop hit for Kenny Rogers and The First Edition, a group that included Settle and Kenny Rogers.  The song also became a major country hit by Bill Anderson in 1969. In 1981, a cover version of "But You Know I Love You" by singer Dolly Parton topped the country singles charts.

Kenny Rogers and The First Edition version

Background
In the song, "But You Know I Love You", the narrator voices regret over not being able to remain with his/her significant other, due to career demands and the need to travel for his/her job. At the time Settle was guitarist for Kenny Rogers and The First Edition, with Rogers singing lead and Settle harmonizing. The fall 1968 release, with a brass-tinged country-folk sound to broaden the group's fan base, peaked at number 19 on the Hot 100 just under a year after "Just Dropped In (To See What Condition My Condition Was In)" peaked. In the group's rendition on The Smothers Brothers Comedy Hour that aired on 8 December 1968, the audience was unwittingly fooled to start clapping too soon, right after the false ending but way before the real ending.

Charts

Weekly chart

Bill Anderson version
Bill Anderson's cover version of "But You Know I Love You" rose to No. 2 on the Billboard magazine Hot Country Singles chart in 1969.

Charts

Weekly chart

Dolly Parton version

Background
Country entertainer Dolly Parton (who, in 1983, would have the number 1 duet "Islands In The Stream" with Rogers) in 1980 included "But You Know I Love You", based on the occupation of on-the-road singer, on her album 9 to 5 and Odd Jobs.  In March 1981, Parton released the song as the album's second single, following the success of "9 to 5," and it reached No. 1 on the Hot Country Singles chart on 20 June 1981, succeeding Rogers' accompanying Dottie West on "What Are We Doin' in Love" at the top slot.  Parton's version also crossed over, bowing at number 82 on 4 April 1981 and peaking at number 41 on 16 May 1981 on the Hot 100 and No. 14 on the AC chart.

Charts

Weekly

Year-End

Other covers 
1969: Bill Anderson for his album My Life / But You Know I Love You (Decca DL 75142).
1969: Ray Stevens for his album Have a Little Talk With Myself (Monument SLP 18134).
1969: Wynn Stewart for his album Yours Forever (Capitol  ST 324).
1969: Teresa Bennett for her album Anita Kerr Presents Teresa (Dot DLP 25944).
1969: The Sweet Inspirations for their album Sweets for My Sweet (Atlantic SD 8225).
1969: Kim Weston and Johnny Nash for their album Johnny Nash & Kim Weston  (Major Minor SMLP 54). 
1970: Barbara Lewis for her album The Many Grooves of Barbara Lewis (Enterprise ENS 1006).
1970: Evie Sands for her album Any Way That You Want Me (A&M SP 4239) (US Billboard #110, AC #30).
1970: Julie Rogers for her album Once More With Feeling (Ember NR 5050). 
1970: Skeeter Davis for her album A Place In the Country (RCA Victor LSP-4310).
1972: Laura Lee for her album Love More Than Pride (Chess CH 50031).
1972: Maria Dallas for her album Town and Country (CBS SBP-234201).
1973: Henson Cargill for his album This Is Henson Cargill Country (Atlantic SD 7279).

References

External links
But You Know I Love You lyrics at Dolly Parton On-Line

1969 songs
1981 singles
Dolly Parton songs
Kenny Rogers songs
Kenny Rogers and The First Edition songs
Bill Anderson (singer) songs
Song recordings produced by Jimmy Bowen
Reprise Records singles
RCA Records singles
Songs written by Mike Settle
Song recordings produced by Mike Post